Brendan Patrick Murray (born August 13, 1995), known professionally as BigHead or BigHead on the Beat, is an American record producer, songwriter and DJ. He is best known for his work in the SoundCloud rap genre. He has produced music for, and performed with, artists such as Lil Pump, Lil Tracy, Famous Dex, YoungBoy Never Broke Again and Lil Peep.

He was named in XXL's list of the 30 best hip hop producers of 2017, adding "You can't listen to this year's rising rap stars without hearing music from BigHead". He is also noted for his producer tag, "Oouu, Bi-BigHead on the beat!".

Early life
Brenden Patrick Murray was born on August 13, 1995, in Palmdale, California. He became a full-time record producer at the age of 18 after his father moved to Arkansas. He grew up in Palmdale and Lancaster.

Career
He initially made beats in the style of Meek Mill and Drake before in 2017 beginning to compose in his own way, "probably 'cause I was high". He first made the top 10 of the Billboard Hot 100 with Lil Pump's "Gucci Gang" that year. He produced six tracks on Pump's self-titled album that year. One of those songs, "Molly", was co-produced with Ronny J.

Artistry
Bighead has spoken of his inspiration from Blink-182, whom he considers made the Billboard chart with simple compositions: "if a three-year-old or a four-year-old can sing it, that's what I aim for. Like "Gucci Gang"".

References

Living people
People from Lancaster, California
Record producers from California
American hip hop record producers
People from Palmdale, California
1995 births